The 2020–21 Northern Football League season was the 123rd in the history of the Northern Football League, a football competition in England. The league has operated two divisions in the English football league system, Division One at step 5, and Division Two at step 6.

The allocations for Steps 5 and 6 for season 2020–21 were announced by the FA on 21 July, and were subject to appeal.

Due to the restrictions on clubs' ability to play matches in the COVID-19 lockdowns, competitions at Steps 3–6 were curtailed on 24 February 2021. The scheduled restructuring of non-league took place at the end of the season, with a new division added to the Northern Premier League at Step 4 for 2021–22, resulting in three Northern League clubs' promotions to that league.

Division One
Division One comprised 20 teams, the same number of teams which competed in the previous season's aborted competition.

Division One table

Stadia and locations

Division Two
Division Two comprised the same 20 teams which competed in the previous season's aborted competition.

Division Two table

Stadia and locations

References

External links
 Northern Football League

2020–21
9
Northern Football League, 2020-21